Outlast is an American survival reality competition series. All eight episodes of the first season premiered on March 10, 2023, on Netflix. It is produced by Aggregate Films and Nomad Entertainment, with Mike Odair serving as the showrunner, and Jason Bateman, Grant Kahler, Michael Costigan, Emma Ho, and Odair serving as executive producers.

The series places 16 players, split into four teams, in the Alaskan wilderness, where they must survive off the land with meager supplies. The players, described as "lone wolf" survivalists, must work in teams and are not allowed to play the game on their own. Players can leave the game by firing a flare gun, and the last team remaining wins one million dollars.

Contestants

Format
16 players are dropped into the Alaskan wilderness and split into four teams. In order to earn a $1 million prize, they will attempt to outlast each other. There are no rules, and no end date, the only guidelines are that only one team will win, and contestants need to be part of a team to win. In order to leave, contestants either self-eliminate, or are removed for medical reasons. Once only two teams remain, the teams engage in a race/hike in order to win.

Production
Season One filmed in the Fall of 2021 in Alaska, near the Neka River, on the Chichagof Island, west of Juneau.

Critical reception
The Guardian Lucy Mangan found the first season "completely addictive, ridiculous and great". The Age Karl Quinn also noted the addictive nature of the series, but bemoaned the lack of clear rules in the competition, which in turn enabled players to cheat and potentially endanger other players. Andy Denhart of Reality Blurred says "With no rules Netflix’s Outlast spawns brilliant, odious, predictable play... (it's) an average survival show that has shocking but predictable behavior to get its $1 million prize."

References

External Links 

 Outlast at Netflix
 Outlast at IMDB

2023 American television series debuts
2020s American reality television series
English-language Netflix original programming
Reality competition television series
Television shows set in Alaska
Works about survival skills